A Man and a Woman is an album by vibraphonist Johnny Lytle featuring jazz interpretations of Francis Lai's score for the 1966 French film A Man and a Woman recorded in 1967 and originally issued on the Solid State label.

Reception
The Allmusic review by Richie Unterberger stated "It's bourgeois to the core, for sure. But it's also archetypal of a certain media stereotype of European elegance, exuding a certain charm despite its overt sentimentality".

Track listing
All compositions by Francis Lai
 "Stronger Than Us" - 4:43
 "Today It's You" - 3:05
 "Samba Saravah" - 3:57
 "A Man and a Woman" - 3:43
 "A Man and a Woman" [Alternate Take] - 3:29
 "Stronger Than Us (Bossa Nova)" - 4:29
 "In Our Shadow" - 5:05

Personnel
Johnny Lytle - vibraphone
Jim Foster - organ
Richard Davis - bass
William "Peppy" Hinnant - drums
Johnny Pacheco - Latin drums

Notes

References

Solid State Records (jazz label) albums
Johnny Lytle albums
1967 albums
Albums produced by Sonny Lester